This is a list of political parties in the Saudi Arabia. 
Many, if not all, of the parties listed are illegal, as Saudi Arabia is an absolute monarchy with a government dominated by the royal family. According to The Economist's 2010 Democracy Index, the Saudi government was the seventh most authoritarian regime from among the 167 countries rated.

List of political parties

See also
List of political parties by country
Politics of Saudi Arabia

References 

 
Saudi Arabia
Political parties
Political parties
Saudi Arabia